Anita Arrow Summers (born September 9, 1925) is an American educator of public policy, management, real estate and education and is Professor Emerita at the University of Pennsylvania.

Biography
Anita Arrow was born in New York City on September 9, 1925. The daughter of Jewish immigrants from Romania, Summers received a B.A. in Economics from Hunter College in 1945 and an M.A. from the University of Chicago in 1947. She earned a doctorate from Columbia University. She married Robert Summers in 1953 and left the workforce to raise three sons.

In 1967, she began teaching economics at Swarthmore College. She led the urban economic department at the Federal Reserve Bank of Philadelphia from 1971-1979, when she joined the Wharton School of the University of Pennsylvania to start the first public policy department in a business school. She chaired that department from 1983-1988. She was a member of Provost's Academic Planning and Budget Committee from 1984–1990, in addition to many other University activities.  She was Ombudsman of the University of Pennsylvania from 2001-2003.

Summers has been a recipient of the Excellence in Teaching Awards at Wharton several times. While technically retired, her expertise is sought as she is considered a leading authority on urban economic development and finance and educational efficiency. She was a member of the Board of Directors and Chair of the Audit Committee of Meridian Bancorp from 1987 to 1996. She was Chair of the Board of Directors of Mathematica Policy Research from 1993-2010.

Currently, she is on that Board, on the Board of Trustees of Waverly Heights, Inc. and President of the Penn Association of Senior and Emeritus Professors of the University of Pennsylvania.

Summers is also a senior research fellow at Wharton's Samuel Zell and Robert Lurie Real Estate Center. Summers has authored and edited many books and reports. She comes from a family of well-known economists, including husband Robert Summers, son Lawrence Summers, brother Kenneth Arrow, and brother-in-law Paul Samuelson.

Publications 
"Manual on procedure for using census data to estimate block income (Research papers - Dept. of Research, Federal Reserve Bank of Philadelphia)" 1975
"Do schools make a difference? (Reprint series - Institute for Research on Poverty, University of Wisconsin)" 1977
"Improving the use of empirical research as a policy tool: An application to education (Research paper - Federal Reserve Bank of Philadelphia)" 1979
"What helps fourth grade students read?: A pupil-, classroom-, program-specific investigation (Research paper)" 1979
"Urban Change in the United States and Western Europe: Comparative Analysis and Policy" 1993

References

External links 
"Ombudsman: Anita Summers", Almanac, University of Pennsylvania, Vol. 48, No. 2, September 4, 2001

1925 births
Living people
20th-century American economists
20th-century American women
21st-century American economists
21st-century American women
American people of Romanian-Jewish descent
American women economists
Columbia University alumni
Hunter College alumni
University of Chicago alumni
University of Pennsylvania faculty
Yale University faculty